Bryan Alois Oelkers (born March 11, 1961) is an American former Major League Baseball pitcher. He attended Pattonville High School in Maryland Heights, Missouri and college at Wichita State. He batted and threw left-handed. He was drafted in the first round (4th pick overall) by the Minnesota Twins, one spot ahead of Dwight Gooden. Oelkers played two years in the majors — 1983 with the Minnesota Twins and 1986 with the Cleveland Indians. In 45 career games, he had a 3–8 record. In 103.1 innings, he allowed 126 hits with an ERA of 6.01. On August 16, 1986, Oelkers notched his only major league save in a 2–1 victory over the Orioles. He went  of an inning, retiring Jim Traber to preserve the victory. Oelkers preserved the win for Hall of Famer Phil Niekro.

He is the first of four Major Leaguers from Spain in history, along with Al Cabrera, Al Pardo, and Danny Rios.

References

External links

1961 births
Living people
Minnesota Twins players
Cleveland Indians players
Wichita State Shockers baseball players
Major League Baseball players from Spain
Major League Baseball pitchers
Visalia Oaks players
Orlando Twins players
Toledo Mud Hens players
Maine Guides players
Buffalo Bisons (minor league) players
Indianapolis Indians players
Iowa Cubs players
Louisville Redbirds players
All-American college baseball players